The 2007–08 Men's EuroFloorball Cup Finals took place in Vantaa, Finland, from 9 to 13 January 2008. Allmänna Idrottsklubben Innebandyförening, better known simply as AIK, won the EuroFloorball Cup for the second year in a row after narrowly defeating Warberg IC 2–1 in sudden victory overtime.

The 2007–08 EuroFloorball Cup marked the first year in which the new name for the tournament was used (previously known as the European Cup). The tournament also marked its 15th year, which was a huge achievement for the International Floorball Federation.

In addition to that, AIK's EuroFloorball Cup victory was the 13th for a Swedish floorball club, and 3rd in a row.

Qualification format 

Since the top 4 nations at the 2006–07 EuroFloorball Cup were from Sweden, Finland, Switzerland and the Czech Republic, the top team in that country automatically advances straight into the final round. In addition to that, the reigning champions receive automatic qualification into the final round as well. 5 teams in total receive automatic qualification.

Since 5 of the 8 spots are filled, the other 3 need to be decided using regional qualification. In Group C, the runners-up to the top team in Sweden, Finland, Switzerland and the Czech Republic play for a spot in the finals. In the 2007–08 EuroFloorball Cup, both the top team in Sweden and the runners-up automatically qualified for the tournament, and therefore Group C consisted of 3 teams instead of 4. In Groups A and B, the teams are split into regions: West Europe and East Europe. The winning team in each group advances to the finals, making the total number of teams eight.

Qualifying venues 
Group A qualifications for Western Europe took place in Bærum, Norway, from 29 August to 2 September 2007.
Group B qualifications for Eastern Europe took place in Ciampino, Italy, from 5 to 9 September 2007.
Group C qualifications took place in Liberec, Czech Republic, from 7 to 9 September 2007.

Championship results

Preliminary round

Conference A

Conference B

Playoffs

Semi-finals

Bronze medal match

Championship match

Placement round

7th place match

5th place match

Statistics and awards

Standings

Awards and All-Star Team 
 Goalkeeper:  Peter Sjögren (Warberg IC)
 Defensemen:  Vesa Punkari (SV Wiler-Ersigen),  Kimmo Eskelinen (Warberg IC)
 Forwards:  Niklas Jihde (AIK Innebandy),  Martin Emanuelsson (Warberg IC),  Conny Westerlund (AIK Innebandy)

External links 
 Official website
 Standings and statistics

EuroFloorball Cup
2008 in floorball